Roger Trudeau (Born April 22, 1976 in Marquette, Michigan) is an American ice hockey forward,

Career

Trudeau began his career playing at the junior level with the Waterloo Blackhawks in the USHL. In two seasons with the Blackhawks, Trudeau played in 61 games with 30 goals, 33 assists and 66 total points.
In 1996 he began his university level career, playing NCAA Div 1 for Norther Michigan University. Trudeau would spend four seasons with Northern Michigan collecting 68 Goals 47 Assists 115 total points. 1999-2000 CCHA First Team Selection. His performances impressed enough to sign a contract with the St Louis Blues of the NHL.

Trudeau would start his pro career in 2000–01 with the Florida Panthers AHL team the Louisville Panthers . He would play for Atlanta Thrashers Affiliate Greenville Grrrowl of the ECHL and Chicago Wolves of the AHL in the following season, Trudeau was an ECHL All Star    For the 2002/03 season, Trudeau made the decision to move to Europe and sign for the 2.Budesliga team Bremerhaven REV and split time with the Riessersee SC in the same league.

Awards and honors

References 

Living people
1976 births